Na Hom is a small village in Bolikhamsai Province, in western Laos. It lies in Paksan District, to the east by road from Paksan and Nong Boua on the road to Na Khaulom

References

Populated places in Bolikhamsai Province